"C'Mon People" is a single from English singer-songwriter Paul McCartney's 1993 album, Off the Ground. The song reached number 41 on the UK Singles Chart. The video for the single was directed by ex-10cc member Kevin Godley and shows McCartney at the piano singing the song while workmen speedily deconstruct it and re-build it around him.

Track listings 
7-inch single
 "C'Mon People" – 5:45
 "I Can't Imagine" – 4:30

CD single
 "C'Mon People" – 5:45
 "I Can't Imagine" – 4:30
 "Keep Coming Back to Love" (McCartney, Hamish Stuart) – 4:59
 "Down to the River" – 3:30

CD single
 "C'mon People" – 5:45
 "Deliverance" – 8:44
 "Deliverance" (dub mix) – 7:41

Charts

References

Paul McCartney songs
1993 singles
1993 songs
Music published by MPL Music Publishing
Parlophone singles
Song recordings produced by Julian Mendelsohn
Song recordings produced by Paul McCartney
Songs written by Paul McCartney